Effingham County is a county located in the southeastern part of the U.S. state of Georgia. As of the 2020 census, the population was 64,769. The seat is Springfield.

Effingham County is included in the Savannah metropolitan area.

In 2008, Effingham County was ranked as the sixth-fastest-growing midsize county in the nation from 2000 to 2007 by the U.S. Census Bureau. The county had a 35.1% growth rate over that period.

History
Effingham was among the original counties of the state of Georgia, created February 5, 1777 during the American Revolution from the colonial parishes of St. Matthew and St. Phillip. Its name honors Lord Effingham, an English champion of colonial rights, who resigned his commission rather than fight against the rebel colonists during the American Revolution.
During the war, most of the Loyalists in what is now Effingham County were first generation Scottish immigrants.  After the war, notable Georgia patriots including Lyman Hall, Samuel Elbert, Edward Telfair, George Walton and Stephen Heard all made direct appeals to the Loyalists of Effingham County to "stay on" in Georgia, under the new republican form of government.  In Effingham County this effort was successful, and virtually all Loyalists in the county stayed.  The town of Springfield was established in 1799, and most likely was named after a plantation.

Geography

The entire western edge of Effingham County, from south of Newington to east of Guyton, then south to southwest of Meldrim, is located in the Lower Ogeechee River sub-basin of the Ogeechee River basin. The bulk of the rest of the county is located in the Lower Savannah River sub-basin of the Savannah River basin. A narrow rectangular portion of south Effingham County, from south of Pineora through Meldrim, is located in the Ogeechee Coastal sub-basin of the Ogeechee River basin.

Major highways

  Interstate 16
  Interstate 95
  U.S. Route 80
  State Route 17
  State Route 21
  State Route 21 Spur
  State Route 26
  State Route 30
  State Route 119
  State Route 275
  State Route 404 (unsigned designation for I-16)
  State Route 405 (unsigned designation for I-95)
  Savannah River Parkway

Adjacent counties
 Hampton County, South Carolina (north)
 Jasper County, South Carolina (northeast)
 Chatham County (southeast)
 Bryan County (south)
 Bulloch County (west)
 Screven County (northwest)

National protected area
 Savannah National Wildlife Refuge (part)

Demographics

2000 census
As of the 2000 United States Census, there were 37,535 people, 13,151 households, and 10,494 families living in the county. The racial makeup of the county was 84.66% White, or European Americans, 12.99% Black or African American, 0.32% Native American, 0.45% Asian, 0.02% Pacific Islander, 0.52% from other races, and 1.04% from two or more races. About 1.41% of the population were Hispanic or Latino of any race.

There were 13,151 households, out of which 43.00% had children under the age of 18 living with them, 64.30% were married couples living together, 11.10% had a female householder with no husband present, and 20.20% were non-families. 16.90% of all households were made up of individuals, and 6.00% had someone living alone who was 65 years of age or older. The average household size was 2.84 and the average family size was 3.18.

In the county, the population was spread out, with 29.90% under the age of 18, 8.20% from 18 to 24, 32.10% from 25 to 44, 21.70% from 45 to 64, and 8.00% who were 65 years of age or older. The median age was 34 years. For every 100 females, there were 98.70 males. For every 100 females age 18 and over, there were 96.20 males.

The median income for a household in the county was $46,505, and the median income for a family was $50,351. Males had a median income of $39,238 versus $23,814 for females. The per capita income for the county was $18,873. About 7.10% of families and 9.30% of the population were below the poverty line, including 10.80% of those under age 18 and 12.60% of those age 65 or over.

2010 census
As of the 2010 U.S. Census, there were 52,250 people, 18,092 households, and 14,139 families living in the county. The racial makeup of the county was 82.6% white, 13.5% black or African American, 0.8% Asian, 0.3% American Indian, 0.8% from other races, and 1.9% from two or more races. Those of Hispanic or Latino origin made up 2.9% of the population. In terms of ancestry, 17.6% were German, 17.0% were Irish, 14.0% were English, and 10.2% were American.

Of the 18,092 households, 43.6% had children under the age of 18 living with them, 60.1% were married couples living together, 12.7% had a female householder with no husband present, 21.8% were non-families, and 17.3% of all households were made up of individuals. The average household size was 2.85 and the average family size was 3.22. The median age was 35.1 years.

The median income for a household in the county was $56,903 and the median income for a family was $63,277. Males had a median income of $49,646 versus $34,554 for females. The per capita income for the county was $23,465. About 8.0% of families and 10.3% of the population were below the poverty line, including 13.2% of those under age 18 and 11.6% of those age 65 or over.

2020 census

As of the 2020 United States census, there were 64,769 people, 21,172 households, and 15,424 families residing in the county.

Economy
In the early years of the 1900s, agriculture was the mainstay of the county economy. The chief agricultural products were Irish potatoes and sweet potatoes. The county farmers raised so many Irish potatoes in the early 1920s that they were shipped out numerous railroad boxcars, full of potatoes, during the summer months of those years.

Small businesses, such as the Effingham Canning Company and Potato Barrel manufacturing mills, became big businesses. The Effingham Canning Company did not last long. It was established in 1918 at the site of the former Savannah Atlanta Railroad Locomotive Repair Shop in Springfield. This site today would be located across the road from Georgia Highway Department Maintenance Building on Georgia Highway 21, south of Springfield. A later canning company operated in the 1940s at the old elementary school grounds in Springfield.

In the early 21st century, Effingham County has had unprecedented demand for industrial locations. Interest in industrial development has been spurred by the area's high population growth, tremendous growth at the Georgia ports and the ever-growing economy of coastal Georgia. Contributors include the military, aerospace industry and a diversified manufacturing base. The Savannah area is home to Gulfstream Aerospace and Hunter Army Airfield.

The Effingham County Industrial Park has announced several new tenants since 2005. In 2007 it became the site of EFACEC Group, a Portuguese-based transformer manufacturer for their North and Central America operations. The U.S. factory is located in Rincon, Georgia and produces both core and shell technology power transformers. Other businesses include the Flint River Services refrigerated storage, ValuePart distribution center, as well as expansions of several existing industries in the park. The site is ideally located on a four-lane divided highway only  from Interstate 95 and within  of the Georgia Ports, the Savannah International Airport and the historic City of Savannah.

The acquisitions include a tract of approximately  adjacent to Interstate 16 and an additional  tract on Interstate 16 seven miles from Interstate 95. Both tracts are within  of the Georgia Ports Authority, and within  of the Chatham County Mega-Site (formerly known as the DaimlerChrysler site) at the strategic intersection of Interstates 95 and 16.

Another recent acquisition is the former Research Forest Tract. Approximately  in size, this will be a "legacy" development to include commercial, executive office, heavy industrial, light industrial, professional service, research and recreational land uses. The site comprises three separate tracts of land six rail miles from the Georgia Ports Authority, with planned access to the Savannah River Parkway, Norfolk Southern mainline rail and CSX mainline rail. The property is being master planned. The development is planned to attract research and development, assembly operations, headquarters and other low-impact operations.

Industry in Effingham County includes paper manufacturing—Georgia Pacific (Savannah River Mill), high-precision turbine blade production—Doncasters, aluminum geodesic dome production—Temcor, concrete pipe manufacturing—Hanson, customized business jet interiors—Edward's Interiors, electrical distribution power transformer production—EFACEC PT, among many others.

Education

Politics
Effingham County has been a reliably Republican county from 1984 onward. After supporting Dixiecrat Strom Thurmond in 1948, it began voting Republican earlier than most Georgia counties, albeit by very narrow margins. Effingham then voted in line with most other rural Deep South counties from 1964 to 1972. The only Democratic Party candidate to win the county since 1944 was Jimmy Carter, who won it convincingly in his statewide landslide in 1976 and narrowly in 1980.

Communities
 Guyton
 Rincon
 Springfield
 Clyo
 Meldrim
 Ebenezer

See also

 National Register of Historic Places listings in Effingham County, Georgia
List of counties in Georgia

References

External links
 Effingham County Government Official Webpage
 Effingham County Chamber of Commerce

 
1777 establishments in Georgia (U.S. state)
Populated places established in 1777
Georgia (U.S. state) counties
Savannah metropolitan area